The English Football League Championship play-offs are a series of play-off matches contested by the association football teams finishing from third to sixth in the EFL Championship table and are part of the English Football League play-offs. , the play-offs comprise two semi-finals, where the team finishing third plays the team finishing sixth, and the team finishing fourth plays the team finishing fifth, each conducted as a two-legged tie. The winners of the semi-finals progress to the final which is contested at Wembley Stadium. The Championship play-off final is considered the most valuable single football match in the world as a result of the increase in revenue to the winning club from sponsorship and media agreements.

For the first three years, the play-off final took place over two legs, played at both side's grounds. Charlton Athletic won the first Championship play-off final in 1987, requiring a replay to defeat Leeds United. From 1990, the play-off final was a one-off match, hosted at the original Wembley Stadium, while from 2001 to 2006, the final was played at the Millennium Stadium in Cardiff as Wembley was being rebuilt. Since 2007, the match has been hosted at Wembley Stadium.

When the second tier play-offs were first contested in 1987, they were known as the Football League Second Division play-offs. From 1993 to 2004, following the creation of the FA Premier League as a breakaway from the Football League, the competition became known as the First Division play-offs, and since 2005 has taken its current name as the Championship play-offs following a rebranding of the remaining three divisions of the Football League.

Format

, the Championship play-offs involve the four teams that finish directly below the automatic promotion places in the EFL Championship, the second tier of the English football league system. These teams meet in a series of play-off matches to determine the final team that will be promoted to the Premier League.  The team finishing in third place plays the sixth-placed team in a two-legged tie, while the team in fourth plays the fifth-placed team, also over two legs; these are referred to as the "play-off semi-finals".  The first match of the semi-finals is played at the side with the lower league position's home ground while the second match takes place at the higher-ranking side's ground.  According to the EFL, "this is designed to give the highest finishing team an advantage".

The winner of each semi-final is determined by the aggregate score across the two legs, with the number of goals scored in each match of the tie being added together.  The team with the higher aggregate score qualifies for the final.  If, at the end of regular 90 minutes of the second leg, the aggregate score is level then the match goes into extra time where two 15-minute halves are played. If the score remains level at the end of extra time, the tie is decided by a penalty shootout.  The away goals rule does not apply in the play-off semi-finals.

The clubs that win the semi-finals then meet at Wembley Stadium, a neutral venue, for a one-off match referred to as the "play-off final".  If required, extra time and a penalty shootout can be employed in the same manner as for the semi-finals to determine the winner.  The runner-up and losing semi-finalists remain in the Championship while the winning side is promoted.  The match, along with the finals of the League One and League Two play-offs, usually takes place over the long weekend of the second bank holiday in May.

Background

The mid-1980s saw a decline in attendances at football matches and public disenchantment with English football.  A number of instances of violence and tragedy struck the game. In March 1985 at the semi-final of the 1984–85 Football League Cup between Chelsea and Sunderland where more than 100 people were arrested after various invasions of the Stamford Bridge pitch and more than 40 people, including 20 policemen, were injured. Nine days later, violence flared at the FA Cup match between Millwall and Luton Town: seats were used as missiles against the police and resulted in Luton Town banning away supporters.  On 11 May, 56 people were killed and 265 injured in the Bradford City stadium fire and less than three weeks later, 39 supporters died and more than 600 were injured in the Heysel Stadium disaster where Liverpool were playing Juventus in the European Cup final.

In an attempt to persuade fans to return to the stadia, the Football League had rejected a £19million television deal to broadcast matches live on the BBC and ITV before the 1985–86 Football League season with League president Jack Dunnett suggesting that "football is prepared to have a year or two with no television".  In December 1985, the "Heathrow Agreement" was agreed which aimed to revitalise the financial affairs of the league.  It was a ten-point plan which included a structural reorganisation of the league, reducing the top tier from 22 clubs to 20, and the introduction of play-offs to facilitate the change.  The play-offs were introduced to the end of the 1986–87 Football League season.  They were initially introduced for two years but with the proviso that if they were successful with the general public, they would be retained permanently.

History
In the first two seasons, the team one place above the relegation zone in the First Division, along with the three clubs below the automatic promotion positions in the Second Division, took part in the play-offs. In the inaugural play-off final, First Division Charlton Athletic faced Second Division Leeds United but they could not be separated over the two home-and-away legs, so the tie was settled in a replay.  Played at a neutral ground, St Andrew's in Birmingham, Charlton won the game 2–1 after extra time to retain their First Division status, while Leeds remained in the Second Division. The following season, Middlesbrough beat Chelsea 2–1 on aggregate, and replaced them in the First Division.  The primary objective of the play-offs was achieved within the first two seasons, namely the reorganisation of the four leagues with 20 clubs in the first tier and 24 in the second to fourth tiers.  However, the popularity of the play-offs was such that the post-season games were retained and the 1989 play-offs were first to feature four teams from the Second Division: Crystal Palace beat Blackburn Rovers 4–3 over two legs after extra time in the final.

From 1990, the format of the final changed to a single match played at a neutral venue, initially the original Wembley Stadium.  The first winners of the inaugural one-off final were Swindon Town who defeated Sunderland 1–0 in the final in front of 72,873 spectators.  Ten days after the final, Swindon were found guilty on 35 counts of illegal player payments and were given a two-division relegation.  This meant that Sunderland were promoted to the First Division in Swindon's place.  Wembley underwent renovations early in the 21st century and the 2000 final was the last to be hosted at the original stadium.  Subsequently the finals were hosted at the Millennium Stadium in Cardiff, where Bolton Wanderers beat Preston North End 3–0 in the final.  The Millennium Stadium held the finals until 2007 when the match was moved to the renovated Wembley Stadium, the first such final seeing Derby County defeat West Bromwich Albion 1–0.  The final in 2020 was held behind closed doors as a result of the COVID-19 pandemic in the United Kingdom: Fulham defeated Brentford 2–1 after extra time in front of an official attendance of 0.

Since the first play-off final, the second tier of English football's league itself has undergone a number of re-brands.  In 1993, the Premier League was formed, a move which caused the second-tier league to be renamed as the First Division.  In 2004, the First Division was re-branded as the Football League Championship, before the League's adoption of English Football League (EFL) led to a 2016 renaming as the EFL Championship.

Prize 
While there is no financial prize for the winners, the match is still referred to as the most valuable single football match in the world as a result of ensuing commercial and media benefits.  Accountants Deloitte described the 2020 final as the "contest for biggest financial prize in world football" with promotion worth at least £85million in the first season after promotion and an additional £80million the following season should an immediate relegation be avoided.  However, by convention the two finalists agree that the loser will keep all the gate receipts from the game, so as to slightly soften the financial blow of missing out.  The winning team is also presented with a trophy.

Winners and semi-finalists

Statistics
Crystal Palace have secured promotion to the top tier of English football through the play-offs more times than any other club, having won four finals.  West Ham United, Watford, Bolton Wanderers, Hull City  and Swindon Town have also won the second-tier play-offs on two occasions (although Swindon have only won promotion through the play-offs once, as promotion was withdrawn following their first play-off victory due to financial irregularities).  Derby County, Reading and Sheffield United have each lost three times in the Championship play-off finals.  Ipswich Town have participated in the Championship play-offs a joint-record eight times: 1987, 1997–2000 inclusive, 2004, 2005 and 2015, making the final only once in 2000 when they won promotion with a 4–2 victory over Barnsley. Derby County have also qualified for the play-offs eight times, with their only promotion coming following a win over West Bromwich Albion in the 2007 final.  Leicester City have reached the Championship play-off final four times (in the space of five seasons), losing two in 1992 and 1993 and winning two in 1994 and 1996.

Notes

References

Bibliography

Championship
Play-offs